Chhabis Pathibhera (Nepali: छब्बीसपाथिभेरा ) is a Gaupalika(Nepali: गाउपालिका ; gaupalika) in Bajhang District in the Sudurpashchim Province of far-western Nepal. 
Chhabis Pathibhera has a population of 16296.The land area is 116.34 km2.

References

Rural municipalities in Bajhang District
Rural municipalities of Nepal established in 2017